Class of '96 is an American drama series that aired on Fox from January to May 1993. The series was created by John Romano and filmed mostly at the University of Toronto.

Synopsis
The series focused on seven students at Havenhurst College in New England. Although the seven come from different backgrounds, circumstance led them to become friends. The series dealt with the differences, both in personality and social status, of the group of friends, the challenges they faced in their first year of college, and social issues such as racism and sexism.

Cast and characters

Main 
Jason Gedrick as David Morrissey, a passionate writer from New Jersey.
Lisa Dean Ryan as Jessica Cohen, a wealthy Jewish student who falls for David.
Megan Ward as Patty Horvath, Jessica's roommate, the daughter of a famous actress.
Brandon Douglas as Whitney Reed, a rich kid who is being trained to follow in his father's footsteps, including living in his father's old college room.
Perry Moore as Antonio Hopkins, Whitney's roommate, an African-American star basketball player from the inner city.
Kari Wührer as Robin Farr, Jessica and Patty's roommate, an attractive girl from Florida.
Gale Hansen as Samuel "Stroke" Dexter, David's roommate, an entrepreneur.

Guest stars 
Guest stars throughout the series run include Gillian Anderson, John Cameron Mitchell, Matt LeBlanc, Julie Bowen, Robin Tunney, Dylan Neal, Elizabeth Dennehy, James LeGros, Fritz Weaver, Reed Diamond, Karyn Dwyer, Mason Adams and Ele Keats. Director and series consultant Peter Horton also made a cameo in one episode as a professor; he was previously known for playing a professor on thirtysomething.

Reception and cancellation
The pilot episode aired on January 19, 1993 with ratings falling steadily after the premiere due to competition from Full House and Hangin' with Mr. Cooper on ABC and Rescue 911 on CBS, all of which ranked in the Top 20 that season. The series was cancelled and finished airing its 17-episode order on May 25.

Episodes

External links
 
 

1993 American television series debuts
1993 American television series endings
1990s American drama television series
1990s American college television series
English-language television shows
Fox Broadcasting Company original programming
Television series by Disney–ABC Domestic Television
Television shows filmed in Toronto